Gymnommopsis gagtea is a species of tachinid flies in the genus Gymnommopsis of the family Tachinidae.

External links

Tachinidae